Charles Scadding (November 25, 1861 – March 29, 1914) was a Canadian-born American Episcopal Church cleric who served as the third bishop of the Episcopal Diocese of Oregon from 1906 to 1914.

Scadding was born in Toronto, Ontario in 1861.  He attended Trinity College, graduating in 1885 and entering the priesthood in 1886.  He served as rector in Christ Church in Middletown, New York, Trinity Church in Toledo, Ohio, and assistant rector at St. George's Episcopal Church in Manhattan.  Scadding was also a lecturer for the London Society for the Propagation of the Gospel.

In 1888, Scadding married Nellie Davy Donaldson.  She died in 1894.  In 1899, he married Mary R. Pomeroy.

On September 29, 1906, Scadding was consecrated Bishop of Oregon. Scadding replaced Benjamin Wistar Morris, who had passed that same year. Morris's old age at the end of his episcopate had led to issues in the diocese. Scadding found the episcopal residence in disrepair and, 1910, commissioned a new home. Both the old residence and the 1911-built structure were known as Bishopcroft.

Scadding died of pneumonia on March 29, 1914, in Portland, Oregon.

References 

Joseph Gaston, Portland, Oregon, Its History and Builders (Portland, S.J. Clarke, 1911, Volume 2), p. 764.

1861 births
1914 deaths
Place of birth missing
Episcopal Church in Oregon
19th-century American Episcopalians
Episcopal bishops of Oregon